Scott Chisholm (born 20 September 1993) is an English actor and television presenter.

Early life
Born in Enfield, London, Chisholm attended St. Andrew's C of E Primary School and Davenant Foundation School. His mother Julia (née Lawrence) is a dance teacher who attended the Arts Educational School before herself performing professionally. It was through her teaching that Chisholm gained an agent at the age of three years old.

Career
After two years' work in advertising, Chisholm made his professional debut at age five as a presenter during the "Small People" segment of BBC Future Generations, a charity programme to benefit Children in Need. He subsequently began presenting for BBC Holiday in Kenya. He was one of three children who appeared in all episodes of the comedy series The Giblet Boys (2005).

Chisholm also Starred in CiTV Children's Comedy series "HELP! i'm the Pirate Teenager!" been first aired in 2000 on CiTV.

Filmography

Film

Television

References

External links 
 
 Thorpe, Vanessa (6 December 1998). "Children's TV Trailer Turns Scott into a Star".  The Independent.  Accessed 11 January 2010.

1993 births
Living people
English male film actors
English male television actors
English male child actors